Government National College, Karachi is a college in Karachi, Pakistan.

Government National College is the biggest college of Karachi being run under one roof, with all the three faculties of science, arts and commerce up to degree level being affiliated with the University of Karachi.

Government of Sindh, with the concept that information technology education should come within the reach of common people, introduced a three-year Bachelor in Computer Science program in ten public sector colleges of the province in 2001. Government National College, Karachi had the honor of being the first selectee for this program. Government of Sindh and the college administration took the project on a war-footing and now the BCS block has fully equipped laboratories, well-furnished classrooms, and an independent library containing several hundred books of various disciplines.

History 
The National Educational Society established the school as the National College, with 'Professor Hasan Adil', Professor M.M. Malik, Professor Hasnain Kazmi, Professor Shamsul Haq and efforts of Kardar who specially helped to get the land for education purpose from Government. The school was established from the home of Professor Hasan Adil in Karachi. He had managed to obtain the services of distinguished scholar, Professor Shamsul Haq, where he along with the other founding members, waived their salaries in the interest of establishing the school for the benefit of the local community. Prof. Hasan Adil serving as the first head from March 1956 to March 1973. Originally the school had co-educated system and a "double shift". On 1 September 1972 the Pakistani government nationalised the school. After nationalization Prof. Syed Imtiaz Hussain, Head of Chemistry Department of this College took the charge of Principal. Under his principalship the College playing a vital role in education of Karachi. In the context of evening classes the name of Dr. Ansar Zahid Khan, a well known literally personality and professor of History became the Incharge of evening shift. The evening shift completely separated and became independent college status, was introduced in 1993 after the Sindh provincial government. In 1996 the Department of Computer Science, under the faculty of Science opened. the first time any government college in Karachi offered that intermediate level. Two years later due to the efforts by Prof.  Rashid Hae, Professor Nazir Ahmed, Professor Ilyas Soomro and Senior Superintendent Naseem, the college could introduce Computer Science at B.Sc. level.

Campus 
The campus is between Alamgir Road and Shaheed-e-Millat Road, in the Karachi Memon Co-operative Housing Society, Gulshan-e-Iqbal Town, Union Council UC-02 in District East.

The college has 30 lecture rooms. The laboratories are well equipped.

In front of the main building there are verdant lawns and flowerbeds along the walkways.

Auditorium
There is a large, centrally located auditorium named after Sir Syed Ahmad Khan, a renowned educationist, a Muslim reformer, a freedom fighter and the founder of Aligarh Muslim University, Aligarh.

Library
The campus library is a two-story building, the upper story of which serves as a place for researchers. The lower story serves as a reading hall for students. Presently, the library has more than 25,000 books on different subjects. The leading dailies of the country are available in the Reading Hall.

Notable alumni
 Ghulam Bombaywala (restaurateur in Houston, Texas)

References

External links
 Government National College, Karachi website

Universities and colleges in Karachi
Educational institutions established in 1956
1956 establishments in Pakistan